Mahmut Hanefi Erdoğdu (born 1 June 1983) is a Turkish footballer playing for the Turkish Super League club Diyarbakirspor. Erdoğdu plays at the defender position. He is 180 cm tall and weighs 79 kilograms. His playing style and hair type is often similar to Brazilian star Roberto Carlos and is called "Carlos" among his teammates.

Honours
 2004 Turkish Super League Champion with Fenerbahçe
 2005 Turkish Super League Champion with Fenerbahçe

References

1983 births
Living people
People from Karasu
Fenerbahçe S.K. footballers
Association football central defenders
Gaziantepspor footballers
Turkish footballers
Sakaryaspor footballers
Süper Lig players
Turkey youth international footballers

Association football defenders